Edvin Kanka Ćudić (born December 31, 1988), is a 
Bosnian human rights activist, martial artist, journalist and political analyst who is best known as the leader of the UDIK, an non-govermental organisation campaigning for human rights and reconciliation in the former Yugoslavia.

Biography

Born as Edvin Ćudić on 31 December 1988 in Brčko, SR Bosnia and Herzegovina (at the time part of Yugoslavia). He grew up in Gračanica and Brčko. He studied at the University of Sarajevo and Ankara University. He got bachelor's degree in journalism from 
University of Sarajevo in 2012. In 2018 earned his master's degree in political science.

At the age of 14, Ćudić joined the Academy of Martial Arts of Bosnia and Herzegovina (a member of the International Martial Arts Federation - IMAF Europe), led by Boško Vidović in Brčko. He trained for eight years and earned a 1st Dan in jujutsu. In 2017 he earned a 1st Dan in judo. 
He began practicing aikido in 2017 under Alen Hadžiabdić in Sarajevo. In 2022 in the 
Vrnjačka Banja he graded 1st Dan by Saša Obradović Shidoin. He is member of the Aikikai
Serbia.

From 2006 to 2008, Ćudić was a jujutsu instructor at the martial arts schools belonging to the Academy of Martial Arts of the Bosnia and Herzegovina, in Donji Žabar and in Gornji Zovik near Brčko.

As a journalist, he collaborated with many regional media outlets, including Danas,
Monitor and Oslobođenje. In order to advance peace and reconciliation processes in the former Yugoslavia, Ćudić collaborated with local and foreign experts, artists, politicians, journalists, as well as professors around the world. Some of them are: Roy Gutman, Ron Haviv, Stjepan Mesić, Florence Hartmann, Robert King, Rémy Ourdan etc. In 2017, he signed the Declaration on the Common Language of the Croats, Serbs, Bosniaks and Montenegrins.

In 2013, Edvin Kanka Ćudić founded and become coordinator of the UDIK. In 2019, he was elected in Regional Council of the RECOM Reconciliation Network.

In UDIK he started activism with public commemorations dedicated to the victims of past war in the former Yugoslavia (1991-2001). At that time, some war crimes were commemorated for the first time in Sarajevo, as well as in other cities in Bosnia and Herzegovina, Croatia, Montenegro and Serbia. These commemorations traced Ćudić to one of the most famous human rights activists in Bosnia and Herzegovina. Through his actions and efforts, he helped to memorize the crimes at Kazani. He is one of the initiators of the memorial at that site.

Controversies 
He often received threats 
related to his work.  

In February 2014, he came into focus of the public during the unrest in Bosnia and Herzegovina. As a coordinator of the protests in the Brčko District, he received over a hundred death threats. In July, he was threatened by Dino Šimunjak, a volunteer in the Israeli–Palestinian conflict who publicly told him: "You will not get out of this, Ćudić".

In February 2015, in front of the Sacred Heart Cathedral in Sarajevo, while UDIK commemorated the anniversary of the Štrpci massacre, a group of hooligans verbally attacked Edvin Kanka Ćudić. On that occasion, they said that activists must go to commemorate crimes in Banja Luka, alluding to the UDIK's marking of crimes in Kravica in January 2015. In May, near the UDIK's office in Sarajevo, Ćudić was verbally attacked along with another UDIK activist. Just a few days later, a similar verbal attack took place at the same site. United States Ambassador to Bosnia and Herzegovina, Maureen Cormack, reacted and said that it was unacceptable to attack a human rights activist in Bosnia and Herzegovina. In October, in front of the Sacred Heart Cathedral in Sarajevo in Sarajevo, while UDIK commemorated the anniversary of the crimes in Kazani, one hooligan tried to physically attack Edvin Kanka Ćudić. Police briefly detained the assailant, but immediately released him and did not prosecute.

In February 2017 Ćudić, was verbally attacked again in Sarajevo, along with two other UDIK activists. The attack took place near the Parliamentary Assembly of Bosnia and Herzegovina building. On that occasion, young men attacked him with stones and called him Chetnik. In March, unknown persons vandalized his car parked near the UDIK's office in Sarajevo.

In April 2019, Ćudić supported 
Bosnia and Herzegovina’s first LGBT Pride Parade in an interview for internet portal Source.ba. Due to the misinterpretation of the interview, especially in the part relating  to the women rights in the Arab world, he received a large number of threats (including death treats) from the Islamic fundamentalists from Bosnia and Herzegovina and Sandžak. Fundamentalists also claimed that he is one of the organizers of the Parade. A few days later, UDIK denied that it organized the parade, but UDIK supported it and showed solidarity to all whose human rights are threatened or deprived. In July, Ćudić and other UDIK activist were verbally attacked near the UDIK office in Sarajevo. On this occasion, the attackers called him The Fags' leader. Ćudić made photos of the attackers and the case was reported to Novo Sarajevo Police Department. Police did not take the photos into consideration during the investigation.

The Federal Ministry of Interior of the Bosnia and Herzegovina has never prosecuted the attackers.

Works

 Taj maj '92. (Brčko, 2012)
 Ne u naše ime: s one strane srbijanskog režima (Sarajevo, 2019)

Honours

In 2012, the Bosnian poet Adem Deniz Garić dedicated him a poem I ne treba da šutiš (And you should not be silent).
The poem was written as a response to Ćudić's article Neću da šutim (I will not be silent), published in 2012 on the occasion of the anniversary of the genocide in Srebrenica.

In 2014 and 2018, in the biographical lexicon Ko je ko u BiH (Who is Who in B&H), Edvin Kanka Ćudić is listed among the most significant people in Bosnia and Herzegovina today, which through their works and actions contribute to a better Bosnia and Herzegovina and who make this country a happier place.

In 2019, the Bosnian-born French sculptor Mirza Morić created a memorial dedicated to the killed civilians in Brčko (1992-1995). Morić engraved the whole story called  (Maybe I should hate them), written by Edvin Kanka Ćudić in 2011. The monument was installed in Paris.

In 2019, Edvin Kanka Ćudić won 2nd place for the Emerging Europe Award in the category: Young Influencer of the Year.

In 2022, the Bosnian poet Erbein Osmanović dedicated him a poem Geronimo.

References

External links

 
 Sarajlije više ne poriču zločine na Kazanima – an interview with Edvin Kanka Ćudić in Oslobođenje
  Danas se zločini negiraju više nego ikada— an interview with Edvin Kanka Ćudić in Danas
 Bosnian gerra ez da inoiz amaitu— an interview with Edvin Kanka Ćudić in Berria
 La memoria, última trinchera de la guerra de Bosnia— an interview with Edvin Kanka Ćudić in El País
 

Living people
People from Brčko District
Bosnia and Herzegovina human rights activists
Bosnia and Herzegovina jujutsuka
Bosnia and Herzegovina male judoka
Bosnia and Herzegovina journalists
Bosnia and Herzegovina political scientists
Signatories of the Declaration on the Common Language
1988 births
Bosnia and Herzegovina aikidoka